Kevin Cywinski (born March 16, 1965) is a former NASCAR driver. He competed in the Craftsman Truck Series full-time in 1998 and 1999, as well as some races in the Busch Series. After leaving NASCAR, he went back down to the short-track ranks. He won the ASA championship series in 2004. He was the co-owner of Win-Tron Racing before merging with AM Racing in 2021 and becoming the operator of the organization.

Craftsman Truck Series
Cywinski made his debut in this series in 1997, when he competed in the #18 Dana Holding Corporation Dodge. His first race was at ORP, where Cywinski started 21st and finished a respectable 20th. Later in the year, Cywinski started 20th at Mesa Marin and came home with a solid 15th-place finish.

Those runs attracted the eyes of Bob Brevak, who hired Cywinski after released Tony Roper midway through 1998. Cywinski got right on it, earning an 8th-place finish in his first outing with the team at Bristol. However, Cywinski struggled for the rest of the year, only recording five top-20 finishes in nineteen races. Cywinski did not finish nine races, but seven of those were mechanical failure. Still, they did not help the team. The main highlight of Cywinski's year was winning the outside pole at Flemington. This was all en route to a 28th-place finish in points.

Brevak stood with Cywinski and his trust was greatly paid in 1999, as Cywinski roared to a 16th-place finish in points after two top-5s and seven top-10s. His best run of the season was a 3rd at Bristol, followed closely by a 4th at Martinsville and the other five top-10s. Cywinski would have proved to be a bigger threat in the points, but his team struggled at some tracks, posting a season average 17.8 finish.

Cywinski left after the year was up to go back short track racing and was replaced by John Young.

Busch Series
Cywinski made two career starts in this series, both coming in 1998. Cywinski debuted in the Ruark Racing #89 Chevy at Hickory. The short track ace qualified the car in 29th, but steadily improved to 19th in the final showing. Key Motorsports was the team that Cywinski drove for next at Richmond. He started that event in 19th, but slid to 25th in the final rundown.

Motorsports career results

NASCAR
(key) (Bold – Pole position awarded by qualifying time. Italics – Pole position earned by points standings or practice time. * – Most laps led.)

Busch Series

Craftsman Truck Series

External links
 
 
 Cywinski Interview-Jan. 2005

1965 births
American Speed Association drivers
ARCA Midwest Tour drivers
Living people
NASCAR drivers
NASCAR team owners
People from Mosinee, Wisconsin
Racing drivers from Wisconsin